The Last Adam, also given as the Final Adam or the Ultimate Adam, is a title given to Jesus in the New Testament. Similar titles that also refer to Jesus include Second Adam and New Adam.

Twice in the New Testament an explicit comparison is made between Jesus and Adam. In Romans 5:12–21, Paul argues that "just as through the disobedience of the one man the many were made sinners, so also through the obedience of the one man the many will be made righteous" (Romans 5:19, NIV). In 1 Corinthians 15:22, Paul argues that "as in Adam all die, so in Christ all will be made alive," while in verse 45 he calls Jesus the "last/ultimate/final Adam".

John Henry Newman used the phrase "Second Adam" in his hymn "Praise to the Holiest in the height", first appearing in The Dream of Gerontius:
O loving wisdom of our God!
When all was sin and shame,
A second Adam to the fight
And to the rescue came.

The title "New Adam" is emphasised in the Recapitulation theory of atonement.

The Pauline representation

Paul the Apostle contrasted Adam and Christ as two corporate personalities or representatives (1 Cor. 15:20–3, 45–9) and saw human beings as bearing the image of both Adam and Christ (1 Cor. 15:49). Where Adam's disobedience meant sin and death for all, Christ's obedience more than made good the harm due to Adam by bringing righteousness and abundance of grace. As a "life-giving spirit", the last Adam is risen from the dead and will transform us through resurrection into a heavenly, spiritual existence (1 Cor. 15:22, 45, 48–9). Thus Paul's Adam Christology involved both the earthly Jesus' obedience (Rom. 5) and the risen Christ's role as giver of the Spirit (1 Cor. 15).

The same symbol, used to express Christ as the corporate, representative personality (and Adam as his foreshadow or "type", per Rom. 5:14), was taken up to express Christ's being: he is "the last Adam" (1 Cor. 15:45), or the "second man from heaven", and one not made "from earth, of dust" (1 Cor. 15:47; see Gen. 2:7). Some scholars detect an Adamic reference in several other New Testament passages: for example, in the language about "the glory of Christ, who is the image (Gr.:eikōn) of God" (2 Cor. 4:4). Perhaps this is an echo of the language of  about Adam being created in the divine image. If so, Paul would be thinking here of Christ as the ideal Adam, with his humanity perfectly expressing the divine image. But this exegesis is not fully convincing.

Colossians 1:15
In , Christ is called "the image (eikōn) of the invisible God, the first-born of all creation". In isolation, this verse could be taken merely in an Adamic sense as referring to Christ as the first created being, the archetypal human being who visibly reflects God, the invisible Creator. However, the context suggests finding the background in personified wisdom, the perfect image of God and the agent of creation. The verses which follow speak of "all things" being "created through him and for him", of his being "before all things", of "all things holding together" in him, and of the plenitude of deity dwelling in him. Any parallelism with Adam, who was simply made in the divine image and likeness, gets left behind here. On the contrary, every created thing, including the angelic "thrones, dominions, principalities, and authorities", is said to have originated through Christ (as creative agent) and for Christ (as final goal), who likewise is the principle of cohesion in holding the universe together. Further, it strains plausibility to argue that a mere Adamic model does justice to the language of "the fullness of God" dwelling in Christ (cf. ).

Like the hymn or poem in Colossians, Hebrews also portrays Christ as the exact (divine) counterpart through whom the Father speaks and is revealed, and who is the one that sustains the entire universe: "He reflects the glory of God and bears the very stamp of his nature, upholding the universe by his word of power" .

The whole context of  suggests a more than Adamic and human interpretation of "the first-born of all creation". Christ is the "first-born" in the sense of being prior to and supreme over all creation, just as by virtue of his resurrection from the dead he is supreme vis-à-vis the Church. The emphatic and repeated "kai autos" (Gr. for "and he") of  underline the absolute "pre-eminence" of Christ in the orders of creation and salvation history; he is pre-eminent both cosmologically and soteriologically. He through whom the universe was created is the same Christ who formed the Church by rising from the dead. He has been active in both creation and redemption.

Philippians 2

This divine status and mode of existence stand in counterpoint (the emphatic "but" of "but he emptied himself") to the subsequent state of "assuming the form of a slave", "being born in human likeness", and "being found in human form". It is what is said in v. 7 that first puts Christ with the community of human beings and their collective image, Adam. Christ belonged to the eternal sphere of divine existence and joined the human (and Adamic) sphere only when he assumed another mode of existence which concealed his proper (divine) being. Nevertheless, in talking of Christ as refusing to use for his own advantage or exploit for himself the godhead which was his, v. 6 might also be contrasting his humility (in becoming human and dying the death of a slave) with the presumptuous aspiration of Adam (and Eve) to enjoy illegitimate equality with God and become "like God".

Post-New Testament symbolism
In post-New Testament times, the symbol of Adam proved a valuable foil for Clement of Alexandria, Origen (d. c.254), St Athanasius of Alexandria (c.296–373), St Hilary of Poitiers (c.315–367), St Gregory of Nazianzus (329–389), St Gregory of Nyssa (c.330–395), and other Church Fathers, when they presented and interpreted the person and work of Christ. St Irenaeus (c.130–200), in particular, did much to elaborate further Paul's antithetical parallelism between Adam and Christ, the latter reversing the failure of the first. In a typical passage of his Adversus haereses, he wrote:
The Son of God... was incarnate and made man; and then he summed up in himself the long line of the human race, procuring for us a comprehensive salvation, that we might recover in Christ Jesus what in Adam we had lost, namely the state of being in the image and likeness of God" (3. 18. 1)

Islam
The Quran directly compares Jesus to Adam in terms of how he came into existence. Sura Al-Imran says, "Verily, the likeness of Jesus before Allah is the likeness of Adam. He created him from dust, then He said to him: 'Be!' – and he was."

See also
 Adam Kadmon
 Logos (Christianity)
 Paul the Apostle
 Old Testament and Adam
 Federal headship
 Names and titles of Jesus in the New Testament

References

Notes

Citations

Sources

Further reading

 Borgen, Peder. Early Christianity and Hellenistic Judaism. Edinburgh: T & T Clark Publishing. 1996.
 Essays in Greco-Roman and Related Talmudic Literature. ed. by Henry A. Fischel. New York: KTAV Publishing House. 1977.
 Ferguson, Everett. Backgrounds in Early Christianity. Grand Rapids: Eerdmans Publishing. 1993.
 Freund, Richard A. Secrets of the Cave of Letters. Amherst, New York: Humanity Books. 2004.
 Greene, Colin J. D. Christology in Cultural Perspective: Marking Out the Horizons. Grand Rapids: InterVarsity Press. Eerdmans Publishing. 2003.
 Holt, Bradley P. Thirsty for God: A Brief History of Christian Spirituality. Minneapolis: Fortress Press. 2005.
 Letham, Robert. The Work of Christ. Downers Grove: InterVarsity Press. 1993.
 MacLeod, Donald. The Person of Christ. Downers Grove: InterVarsity Press. 1998.
 McGrath, Alister. Historical Theology: An Introduction to the History of Christian Thought. Oxford: Blackwell Publishing. 1998.
 Moore, Edwin. "Neoplatonism." in The Internet Encyclopedia of Philosophy. ed. by James Fieser and Bradley Dowden. 2006. Available at iep.edu
 Neusner, Jacob. From Politics to Piety: The Emergence of Pharisaic Judaism. Providence, R. I.: Brown University. 1973.
 Norris, Richard A. Jr. The Christological Controversy. Philadelphia: Fortress Press. 1980.
 Pelikan, Jaroslav. Development of Christian Doctrine: Some Historical Prolegomena. London: Yale University Press. 1969.
 ___ The Emergence of the Catholic Tradition (100–600). Chicago: University of Chicago Press. 1971.
 Robertson, J. A. T. Redating the New Testament. 2nd ed. Philadelphia: Westminster Press. 1985.
 Schweitzer, Albert. Quest of the Historical Jesus: A Critical Study of the Progress from Reimarus to Wrede. trans. by W. Montgomery. London: A & C Black. 1931.
 Tyson, John R. Invitation to Christian Spirituality: An Ecumenical Anthology. New York: Oxford University Press. 1999.
 Wilson, R. Mcl. Gnosis and the New Testament. Philadelphia: Fortress Press. 1968.
 Witherington, Ben III. The Jesus Quest: The Third Search for the Jew of Nazareth. Downers Grove: InterVarsity Press. 1995.
 ___ "The Gospel of John." in The Dictionary of Jesus and the Gospels. ed. by Joel Greene, Scot McKnight and I. Howard

Christology
New Testament words and phrases
Religious concepts related with Adam and Eve